HDHS may refer to:
 Haribhai Deokaran High School, Solapur, Maharashtra, India
 Harrow District High School, Harrow, Ontario, Canada
 Harwich and Dovercourt High School, Essex, England
 Hiwassee Dam High School, Murphy, North Carolina, United States